Cavariella is a genus of true bugs belonging to the family Aphididae.

The genus was first described by Del Guercio in 1911.

The genus has almost cosmopolitan distribution.

Species
These species belong to the genus Cavariella:

 Cavariella aegopodii (Scopoli, 1763) (carrot-willow aphid)
 Cavariella angelicae (Matsumura, 1918)
 Cavariella aquatica (Gillette & Bragg, 1916)
 Cavariella araliae Takahashi, 1921
 Cavariella archangelicae (Scopoli, 1763)
 Cavariella aspidaphoides Hille Ris Lambers, 1969
 Cavariella bhutanensis Chakrabarti & Das, 2009
 Cavariella biswasi Ghosh, Basu & Raychaudhuri, 1969
 Cavariella borealis Hille Ris Lambers, 1952
 Cavariella bunii
 Cavariella cessana Zhang, Chen, Zhong & Li, 1999
 Cavariella cicutae (Koch, 1854)
 Cavariella cicutisucta Qiao, 2005
 Cavariella digitata Hille Ris Lambers, 1969
 Cavariella gilgiana Zhang, Chen, Zhong & Li, 1999
 Cavariella gilibertiae Takahashi, 1961
 Cavariella hendersoni Knowlton & Smith, 1936
 Cavariella heraclei Takahashi, 1961
 Cavariella hidaensis Takahashi, 1961
 Cavariella himachali
 Cavariella indica
 Cavariella intermedia Hille Ris Lambers, 1969
 Cavariella japonica (Essig & Kuwana, 1918)
 Cavariella kamtshatica
 Cavariella konoi Takahashi, 1939
 Cavariella largispiracula Zhang, Chen, Zhong & Li, 1999
 Cavariella lhasana Zhang, 1981
 Cavariella longicauda
 Cavariella nigra Basu, 1964
 Cavariella nigrocaudata Takahashi, 1965
 Cavariella nipponica Takahashi, 1961
 Cavariella oenanthi (Shinji, 1922)
 Cavariella pastinacae (Linnaeus, 1758)
 Cavariella pseudopustula Hille Ris Lambers, 1969
 Cavariella pustula Essig, 1937
 Cavariella rutila
 Cavariella salicicola (Matsumura, 1917)
 Cavariella salicis (Monell, 1879)
 Cavariella sapporoensis Takahashi, 1961
 Cavariella saxifragae Remaudière, 1959
 Cavariella sericola
 Cavariella simlaensis
 Cavariella takahashii Hille Ris Lambers, 1965
 Cavariella theobaldi (Gillette & Bragg, 1918)

References

Aphididae